Melanella anachorea is a species of sea snail, a marine gastropod mollusk in the family Eulimidae. The species is one of many species known to exist within the genus, Melanella.

Description 
The maximum recorded shell length is 5 mm.

Habitat 
Minimum recorded depth is 805 m. Maximum recorded depth is 805 m.

References

External links

anachorea
Gastropods described in 1927